The 2005–06 St. Francis Terriers men's basketball team represented St. Francis College during the 2005–06 NCAA Division I men's basketball season. The team was coached by Brian Nash, who was in his first year at the helm of the St. Francis Terriers. The Terrier's home games were played at the  Generoso Pope Athletic Complex. The team has been a member of the Northeast Conference since 1981.

Nash's team finished at 10–17 overall and 7–11 in conference play for a 9th-place finish. It marks the first time in 15 seasons that the Terriers have not made it to the NEC Conference Tournament.

Roster

Schedule and results

|-
!colspan=12 style="background:#0038A8; border: 2px solid #CE1126;;color:#FFFFFF;"| Exhibition
  
|-
!colspan=12 style="background:#0038A8; border: 2px solid #CE1126;;color:#FFFFFF;"| Regular Season

References

St. Francis Brooklyn Terriers men's basketball seasons
St. Francis
2005 in sports in New York City
2006 in sports in New York City